NESBA may refer to:
New England Scholastic Band Association
Northeast Sportbike Association

See also
 Nisba (disambiguation)